The British Virgin Islands have attended all seven Commonwealth Games since 1990.

Having first competed at Auckland in 1990, the British Virgin Islands had never won a medal of any colour at a Commonwealth Games until Kyron McMaster won the men's 400m hurdles at the 2018 Commonwealth Games at Gold Coast.

It was McMaster's first global title, having been disqualified from the 400m hurdles at the 2017 IAAF World Athletics Championships, though did go on to win the 2017 IAAF Diamond League title the following month.

References

 
Nations at the Commonwealth Games